The British Military Administration of Somali was the control of the regions of British Somaliland and of the former Italian Somaliland by the British from 1941 until 1949. At the end of 1949, it became a United Nations trust territory which would last from 1950 until 1960 whilst under Italian administration.

Overview

During the Second World War, Britain occupied Italian Somaliland and militarily administered the territory as well as British Somaliland. Faced with growing Italian political pressure inimical to continued British tenure and Somali aspirations for independence, the Somalis and the British came to see each other as allies. The first modern Somali political party, the Somali Youth Club (SYC), was subsequently established in Mogadishu in 1943; it was later renamed the Somali Youth League (SYL). The SYL evolved into the dominant party, and had a moderate ideology. Hizbia Digil Mirifle Somali (HDMS) party served as the principal opposition to the right, although its platform was generally in agreement with that of the SYL.

In 1945, the Potsdam conference was held, where it was decided not to return Italian Somaliland to Italy, and that the territory would be under British Military Administration (BMA). As a result of this failure on the part of the Big Four powers to agree on what to do with Italy's former colonies, Somali nationalist rebellion against the Italian colonial administration culminated in a violent confrontation in 1948. 24 Somalis and 51 Italians died in the ensuing political riots in several coastal towns.

In November 1949, the United Nations finally opted to grant Italy trusteeship of Italian Somaliland, but only under close supervision and on the condition — first proposed by the Somali Youth League and other nascent Somali political organizations, such as Hizbia Digil Mirifle Somali (later Hizbia Dastur Mustaqbal Somali, or HDMS) and the Somali National League (SNL), that were then agitating for independence — that Somalia achieves independence within ten years.

See also
 Allied occupation of Libya

References

20th century in Somalia
Aftermath of World War II in the United Kingdom
Somalia
Military history of the British Empire and Commonwealth in World War II
Military history of the United Kingdom during World War II
States and territories established in 1941
States and territories disestablished in 1949
1949 disestablishments in Africa
1941 establishments in Africa